Arian Kabashi (born 26 September 1996) is a Kosovan professional footballer who plays as a centre-back for Finnish club Lahti.

Club career

Sion
On 5 July 2020, Kabashi made his debut as a professional footballer in a 2–1 away defeat against St. Gallen after coming on as a substitute at 46th minute in place of Jean Ruiz.

Lahti
On 26 July 2022, Kabashi joined Veikkausliiga side Lahti until the end of the season. Three days later, he made his debut in a 1–1 home draw against Ilves after coming on as a substitute at 66th minute in place of Arlind Sejdiu.

International career
At the start of April 2013, Kabashi received a call-up from Albania U15 for a selection camp in Switzerland. On 21 March 2017, he received a call-up from Kosovo U21 for a 2019 UEFA European Under-21 Championship qualification match against Republic of Ireland U21, and made his debut after being named in the starting line-up.

Career statistics

Club

References

External links

1996 births
Living people
People from Sierre
Sportspeople from Valais
Kosovan footballers
Kosovo under-21 international footballers
Swiss men's footballers
Swiss people of Kosovan descent
Swiss people of Albanian descent
Association football central defenders
2. Liga Interregional players
Swiss 1. Liga (football) players
Swiss Promotion League players
Swiss Super League players
FC Martigny-Sports players
FC Sion players
Veikkausliiga players
FC Lahti players